Lepaera is a municipality in the Honduran department of Lempira. It has tropical climate all year round.

Lepaera is one of the oldest municipalities of the Lempira department. It is also the departmental capital of the municipality. The distance to Lepaera from Gracias is 15 km on the road that leads to Santa Rosa de Copán Access is paved but dangerous curves necessitate caution.

History 

It is considered an "autochthonous" settlement since 1538 with inhabitants such as Lencas, Toltecas or Chorties Indians, it is believed that these people came from the region of "Cuscatlán" in El Salvador. Between 1536 and 1538, when the Spanish colonist founded the city of Gracias, there was Lepaera already, as well as other municipalities. The title of City was granted under decree No 81 on 8 October 1956.

Geography 

It was established at the toe of "Puca" mountain, and it is surrounded by several other hills. Downtown of the departmental capital has steep streets. The elevation from sea level is proper for coffee plantations. It has sub tropical and pine forests on the highest parts, but the weather in the departmental capital is warm due to deforesting.

Boundaries 
Its boundaries are: 
North : Santa Barbara department.
South : Gracias and Las Flores municipalities.
East  : La Iguala municipality and "Santa Barbara" department.
West  : Copán department.
Surface Extents: 312 km²

Resources 

Planting, gathering, and processing of coffee grains represents the most important commercial activity of this municipality. The 2nd most important activity is commerce. The coffee production makes the city grow faster each year. It has several hardware stores, groceries stores, and a gas station at the entrance of the city. Also it has electricity and mobile communications services. The water is obtained from wells and some streams coming from "Puca" mountain.

Population 
The native Indians descendants have been displaced a long time by the cross-breed of Spanish and Indians.
Population: The figure was 3,866 people in 2001. Based on this, an estimate was elaborated for 2015, resulting in 37,876.
Villages: 45
Settlements: 135

Demographics
At the time of the 2013 Honduras census, Lepaera municipality had a population of 36,720. Of these, 96.15% were Mestizo, 2.72% Indigenous (2.42% Lenca), 0.78% White,  0.32% Black or Afro-Honduran and 0.03% others.

Tourism 

The city of Lepaera is a welcoming, picturesque, nice place to visit. The streets are narrow and distinctive. The old Catholic church in downtown of the city has the following inscription:  JVLYO 28 1640  (28 July 1640), and it is perhaps of the oldest in Lempira department. People are warm and friendly. There is a very nice and comfortable hotel. Also there are several locations where the tourist can buy homemade ground coffee, known as "Café de Palo", which is very aromatic and has a great taste.

Local Holidays: "Santiago" day on 25 July and also "Señor de Esquipulas" day on 25 January.

Sports
The local football team, Lepaera San Isidro, play in the Honduran second division.

Gallery

References

External links

Municipalities of the Lempira Department